Stacy Mitchhart (born February 16, 1959) is an American blues guitarist.

Mitchhart began his professional career in Cincinnati, Ohio, playing the club circuit there and gaining widespread attention in the early 1990s. In 1996, he moved to Nashville to take up residence as house band at the Bourbon Street Blues and Boogie Bar in famous Printer's Alley.

In 2003, Mitchhart received the Albert King Most Promising Guitarist Award at the Blues Foundation's International Blues Challenge in Memphis, Tennessee. His album, Gotta Get The Feeling Back Again album was considered for a Grammy Award in 2008. Mitchhart was inducted into the South Canadian Blues Hall Of Fame in 2016.

He is married to Tawana Mitchhart, and has three adopted children: Kenzie, Milan, and CJ. They currently reside in Nashville, Tennessee.

Discography
1993 Blues Transfusion
1994 Simple Medicine
1995 Live From the Slippery Noodle Inn Vol. III
1997 Stacy Mitchhart and Blues-U-Can-Use "Live" at Bourbon Street Blues and Boogie Bar
1998 Bourbon Street Blues and Boogie Bar... Nothin' But
2001 What I Feel
2004 Midnight Breeze
2005 Stacy Mitchhart Live! in Concert
2006 I'm A Good Man
2007 Gotta Get The Feeling Back Again
2009 Live From B.B. King's
2011 ‘’Grown Ass Man’’
2015 ‘’Live My Life’’
2017 ‘’Stacy Mitchhart’’
2019 ‘’Bring It On Home’’

References

External links
Official website

1959 births
Living people
American blues guitarists
American male guitarists
Musicians from Nashville, Tennessee
Musicians from Cincinnati
Songwriters from Ohio
Songwriters from Tennessee
Guitarists from Tennessee
Guitarists from Ohio
20th-century American guitarists
20th-century American male musicians
American male songwriters